The Chemung County Courthouse Complex consists of four buildings built between 1836 and 1899.  The oldest building, built in 1836, is the District Attorney's and Treasurer's Building.  The centerpiece, the courthouse itself, was designed by Horatio Nelson White, and built in 1861–62. These were followed by the County Clerk's Office in 1875 and the addition of the Court House Annex in 1895.  The complex was added to the National Register of Historic Places in 1971.

References

Historic districts on the National Register of Historic Places in New York (state)
Government buildings completed in 1899
County courthouses in New York (state)
Government buildings on the National Register of Historic Places in New York (state)
Buildings and structures in Elmira, New York
1836 establishments in New York (state)
National Register of Historic Places in Chemung County, New York
Courthouses on the National Register of Historic Places in New York (state)